Treasure Island is a city in Pinellas County, Florida, United States. It is situated on a barrier island in the Gulf of Mexico.

As of the 2020 census, the city population was 6,584.

Geography
According to the U.S. Census Bureau, the city has a total area of 5.3 square miles (13.8 km), of which 1.6 square miles (4.1 km) is land and 3.7 square miles (9.7 km) (70.11%) is water.

Demographics

At the 2000 census there were 7,450 people in 4,128 households, including 2,059 families, in the city. The racial makeup of the city was 97.69% White, 0.28% African American, 0.28% Native American, 0.59% Asian, 0.03% Pacific Islander, 0.43% from other races, and 0.70% from two or more races. Hispanic or Latino residents of any race were 2.23%.

Of the 4,128 households 10.0% had children under the age of 18 living with them, 43.8% were married couples living together, 4.2% had a female householder with no husband present, and 50.1% were non-families. 41.5% of households were one person and 14.3% were one person aged 65 or older.  The average household size was 1.80 and the average family size was 2.38.

The age distribution was 9.2% under the age of 18, 2.7% from 18 to 24, 23.4% from 25 to 44, 38.5% from 45 to 64, and 26.3% 65 or older.  The median age was 52 years. For every 100 females, there were 95.8 males.  For every 100 females age 18 and over, there were 95.0 males.

The median household income was $42,150 and the median family income  was $64,158. Males had a median income of $38,903 versus $32,586 for females. The per capita income for the city was $34,965.  About 3.9% of families and 5.6% of the population were below the poverty line, including 0.4% of those under age 18 and 6.9% of those age 65 or over.

History
The area of Treasure Island was originally settled in small communities by the Tocobaga around 300 CE.  The Timucua traded with other Native American tribes in the area until the arrival of Pánfilo de Narváez in 1528.  De Narváez decimated the indigenous people before leaving the area in search of gold.

Treasure Island got its name early in the 20th century, after several property owners attempted to boost sales of the properties being developed on the island by first burying and then pretending to discover a couple of wooden chests on the beach around 1915. After claiming the chests were filled with treasure, the news of the discovery quickly spread and people began calling the island Treasure Island.

With an elevation of only three feet, the Great Gale of 1848 carved out John's Pass on the island's north end and split off two smaller islands, called the Isle of Palms and Isle of Capri.

Treasure Island saw a surge in residential and hotel construction following World War II through the 1950s.  The real estate used in these ventures often consisted of fill from dredged material; that is, artificial  extensions of the land were created, which were usually designed for convenient access to navigable waterways.

Treasure Island today has a thriving bar and restaurant scene in its downtown.

Climate
Treasure Island has a humid subtropical climate, closely bordering a tropical climate, resulting in warm, humid summers with frequent thunderstorms, and drier winters.

Library
The community is served by the Gulf Beaches Public Library, located in nearby Madeira Beach. The library is supported by Madeira Beach, Redington Beach, North Redington Beach, Redington Shores, and Treasure Island. These five communities have combined their resources in order to fund the library, which they would not be able to maintain individually.

Notable people
 Michael Clarke, rock drummer for The Byrds, Flying Burrito Brothers, and Firefall
 Babe Ruth, legendary baseball slugger
 Jerry Sags, WWE and WCW professional wrestler

References

External links
 City of Treasure Island official website
 Treasure Island Chamber of Commerce

Cities in Pinellas County, Florida
Gulf Coast barrier islands of Florida
Cities in Florida
Populated coastal places in Florida on the Gulf of Mexico
Islands of Pinellas County, Florida
Beaches of Pinellas County, Florida
Beaches of Florida
Islands of Florida